Kathleen Hering is a German bobsledder who competed in the late 1990s and early 2000s. She won the gold medal in the debut two-woman event at the 2000 FIBT World Championships in Winterberg.

References
Bobsleigh two-woman world championship medalists since 2000

German female discus throwers
German female bobsledders
Living people
Year of birth missing (living people)